Fujinohira Dam is a rockfill dam located in Saga Prefecture in Japan. The dam is used for agriculture. The catchment area of the dam is 15.6 km2. The dam impounds about 21  ha of land when full and can store 3575 thousand cubic meters of water. The construction of the dam was started on 1990 and completed in 2002.

References

Dams in Saga Prefecture
2002 establishments in Japan